Bronx Community Board 12 is a local government unit of the New York City borough of the Bronx, encompassing the neighborhoods of Edenwald, Wakefield, Williamsbridge, Woodlawn Heights, Fish Bay, Eastchester, Olinville and Baychester.

It is delimited by Van Cortlandt Park East and Jerome Avenue to the west, Adee Avenue and Gun Hill Road East to the south, the New England Thruway to the east and the Westchester County border to the north.

Community board staff and membership
The current chairperson of the Bronx Community board 12 is Dr. Michael Burke. Its District Manager is George Torres. 

The City Council members representing the community district are non-voting, ex officio board members. The council members and their council districts are:
 11th NYC Council District - Eric Dinowitz
 12th NYC Council District - Kevin Riley
 13th NYC Council District - Mark Gjonaj
 15th NYC Council District - Ritchie Torres

Demographics
The board has a population of 149,077 and is 10% White or Caucasian, 65.9% Black or African American. 15.3% Asian or Pacific Islander, 0.2% American Indian and Alaska Native Nonhispanic 0.7% of other races 3.0% of mixed race and 18.5% Hispanic.

Board Meetings
The Bronx Community 12 Board typically meets on the fourth Thursday of each month at 7:30pm at the Town Hall, 4101 White Plains Road, Bronx, New York 10466. Meeting times can be viewed on the official website; citizens can contact the office directly to learn about upcoming meetings that have not been updated to the website.

References

External links
  
 

Community boards of the Bronx